The black-and-white shrike-flycatcher (Bias musicus), also known as the black-and-white flycatcher or vanga flycatcher, is a species of passerine bird found in Africa. It was placed with the wattle-eyes and batises in the family Platysteiridae but is now considered to be more closely related to the helmetshrikes and woodshrikes.

It is found in Angola, Benin, Cameroon, Central African Republic, Republic of the Congo, Democratic Republic of the Congo, Ivory Coast, Equatorial Guinea, Gabon, Gambia, Ghana, Guinea, Guinea-Bissau, Kenya, Liberia, Malawi, Mozambique, Nigeria, Sierra Leone, South Sudan, Tanzania, Togo, Uganda, and Zimbabwe. Its natural habitats are subtropical or tropical dry forest, subtropical or tropical moist lowland forest, and subtropical or tropical moist montane forest.

References

External links
 Black-and-white shrike-flycatcher/vanga flycatcher - Species text in The Atlas of Southern African Birds.

black-and-white shrike-flycatcher
Birds of Sub-Saharan Africa
black-and-white shrike-flycatcher
Taxa named by Louis Jean Pierre Vieillot
Taxonomy articles created by Polbot